Wunnumin 1 is a First Nations reserve in Kenora District, Ontario. It is one of two reserves of the Wunnumin Lake First Nation.

References

Oji-Cree reserves in Ontario
Communities in Kenora District
Road-inaccessible communities of Ontario